The Montreal Economic Institute (MEI) is a non-profit research organization (or think tank) based in Montreal, Quebec, Canada. It aims at promoting economic liberalism through economic education of the general public and what it regards as efficient public policies in Quebec and Canada through studies and conferences. Its research areas include different topics such as health care, education, taxation, labour, agriculture and the environment. Its studies are often mentioned in the media.

History
The MEI was incorporated in July 1987, after being created by a group of Québec intellectuals and businessmen as the continuation of the Institut économique de Paris à Montréal (which was directed by economists Pierre Lemieux). MEI's activities soared in the late 1990s with the nomination of Michel Kelly-Gagnon as executive director. The institute rapidly established a leading place in debates on economic policy in the province of Quebec and managed to attract leading academics. Several members of its board of directors and many of its fellows play a significant role in Quebec's economy as entrepreneurs or intellectuals.

Maxime Bernier served as its vice president, from May to November 2005, before he became federal Minister of Industry. Bernier explained that his role at the Institute was mainly fundraising and act as an advisor to Kelly Gagnon.  Tasha Kheiriddin also briefly occupied this position from March to September 2006, before moving to the Quebec branch of the Fraser Institute. From February 2007 to October 2009, the vice president was Marcel Boyer, professor of economics at the University of Montreal. The vice president is currently Jasmin Guénette, former director of public affairs who came back after spending two years at the Institute for Humane Studies in Virginia.

Paul Muller was president of the MEI from 2006 to 2012 and former policy adviser to leader of  Action démocratique du Québec, Mario Dumont.

From 2000 until 2008, the MEI prepared a ranking of Quebec high schools published in L'actualité magazine every fall.

In 2009, Kelly Gangon returned to the MEI as president and moved the organisation from a $269,342 deficit for financial year ending December 31, 2008 to a $153,188 surplus (as of December 31, 2009) in the context of a severe recession

During 2012 Quebec student protests, their office was damaged by militants who disapproved of their positions.

MEI recruited Joe Oliver, the former Minister of Finance in Stephen Harper's Conservative Party of Canada government, as a 'Distinguished Senior Fellow' in 2016.

Youri Chassin,  who was the research director from 2012-2017 was elected as MNA for Saint-Jérôme.

Description
The MEI states that it does not participate in partisan activities. Its public interventions are meant only to analyze the relevance of public policies, their costs and benefits, and their impact on individuals and on private and public organizations. Our work remains the same regardless of who proposes or opposes specific policies.

While it rejects characterizations such as "right-wing" and "libertarian," MEI advocates policies in line with economic liberalism, such as loosening Quebec’s labour laws, increasing the transparency of labour union financing, merit pay for teachers, and ending Canada Post's monopoly on letter delivery, as well as a general downsizing of the state.

The MEI states that it maintains a wall between its researchers and its donors. According to the MEI's website, publications and videos are not submitted to donors or their representatives for approval or editing before they are released.

Funding 
MEI is a registered Canadian charity and Kelly-Gagnon has said that 65-70% of MEI's funding comes from foundations, with an additional 15-20% coming from individuals and the remainder coming from corporations; it does not accept funding from the public sector.  Its 2015 budget was $2.3 million, and had a full-time staff of 12 as of March 2016. Its tax returns indicate that major support comes from the Stowers Institute for Medical Research, the  Donner Canadian Foundation, and the Chase Foundation of Virginia. It has also received funding from the Claude R. Lambe Charitable Foundation and the John Templeton Foundation.

Reputation
Commentators often characterize it as Quebec's equivalent to the Fraser Institute and a voice of fiscal conservationism in Quebec. Former MEI vice president Tasha Kheiriddin placed it in the same group as the Fraser Institute as well as the National Citizens Coalition, Frontier Centre for Public Policy, the Canadian Taxpayers Federation, and the Atlantic Institute for Market Studies. An analysis of social networks on Twitter by the Institute for Research on Public Policy found that MEI is one of the Canadian think tanks with the highest "right-wing" scores, along with the Manning Centre, the Frontier Centre for Public Policy, the Canadian Taxpayers Federation, the C.D. Howe Institute, the Canada West Foundation, and the Atlantic Institute for Market Studies.

Another former MEI vice president, Bernier stated the institute influenced him as an Industry Minister by giving him the experience to learn about public policies and how to implement good public policies.

Their reasoning was also questioned on several occasions by the Institut de recherche et d'informations socio-économiques,. Ethan Cox, a political organizer and writer, has said that "MEI is part of the same problem they have with money in the U.S. political process: corporate interests who can outspend critics have too much influence in our political process."

Fellows and Associate Researchers
 James M. Buchanan – Senior Fellow honoraire
 Vernon L. Smith – Senior Fellow honoraire
 Nathalie Elgrably-Lévy – Senior Economist
 Pierre Lemieux – Senior Fellow
 Adam Daifallah – Fellow
 Marie-Josée Loiselle – Fellow
 Etienne Bernier
 Sylvain Charlebois
 J. Edwin Coffey
 Pierre Desrochers
 André Duchesne
 Claude Garcia
 Vincent Geloso
 F. Pierre Gingras
 Ian Irvine
 Pierre J. Jeanniot
 Robert Knox
 Patrick Dery
 Valentin Petkantchin

References

External links
 Montreal Economic Institute

Conservatism in Canada
Political and economic think tanks based in Canada
Right-wing politics in Canada
Libertarian think tanks
Libertarianism in Canada